Gioconda's Smile is one of the most famous albums by Greek composer Manos Hadjidakis. It is considered one of the classic albums of 20th-century music in Greece.

The album was recorded in New York in 1965, with Quincy Jones as producer. It was first released in USA in 1965 with twelve orchestral songs, and that same year in Greece, but "The Athletes" and "The Soldier" were not included.

The album was re-released in 2004, as part of the EMI Classics series.

The album was re-released with a variety of covers. Except for the first version, which was released in USA, all of the covers featured Mona Lisa. The cover (inspired and executed by Marianna Xenaki) and, most notably, the title of the album are explained by Manos Hadjidakis in the introductory note he wrote for the album:

Track listing

References

External links
[ Gioconda's Smile at Allmusic]
Gioconda's Smile live at YouTube
Manos Hadjidakis official website

1965 albums
Manos Hatzidakis albums
Albums produced by Quincy Jones
Fontana Records albums
EMI Records albums
EMI Classics albums